Chatfield-Taylor is a surname. Notable people with the surname include: 
Adele Chatfield-Taylor (born 1945), American arts administrator
Hobart Chatfield-Taylor (1865–1945), American author
Rose Farwell Chatfield-Taylor (1870–1918) American golfer, bookbinder, and socialite
Wayne Chatfield-Taylor (1893–1967), a member of the Franklin D. Roosevelt administration

See also
Chatfield (surname)
Taylor (surname)
Chatham Taylor

Compound surnames
English-language surnames
Surnames of English origin